Vikram Nair (born 1978) is a Singaporean politician and lawyer. A member of the governing People's Action Party (PAP), he has been the Member of Parliament (MP) representing the Admiralty division of Sembawang GRC since 2011.

Education
Nair was educated at Anglo-Chinese School (Independent) and Raffles Junior College before graduating from the Trinity College at the University of Cambridge under the Jardine Foundation Scholarship, where he read law.

He was awarded the college's Lizette Bentwich Prize for Law in 2002. He served as Director of Debating at the Cambridge Union Society between 2001 and 2002, and was ranked the No. 3 individual speaker at the 2002 World Universities Debating Championship in Toronto, Canada.

Nair also completed a graduate diploma in Singapore Law at the National University of Singapore in 2005.

Career
From 2002 to 2004, Nair worked as a management consultant at McKinsey & Company. He then joined the law firm Allen & Gledhill in 2005, where he worked in the Dispute Resolution Department. From 2008 to 2014, Nair worked at the law firm Norton Rose, and since 2014 he has been with Rajah & Tann.

From 2010 to 2011, Nair was the vice-chairman of Singapore's Malayalam Language Education Society. He is currently the chairman of the Tamil Language Learning and Promotion Committee, and has served on the committees of various other non-profit societies in Singapore.

Political career
Nair was elected into Parliament as an MP for Sembawang GRC at the 2011 general election. He was part of the PAP team led by the Minister for Health, Khaw Boon Wan, which defeated the team from the Singapore Democratic Party by 84,252 votes (63.9%) to 47,605 (36.1%). Since the election, Nair has represented the Admiralty ward of Sembawang GRC.

Nair was re-elected as an MP at the 2015 general election, when the PAP team in Sembawang defeated the team from the National Solidarity Party by 96,639 votes (72.3%) to 37,067 (27.7%). Within Parliament, Nair has served as a member of the Government Parliamentary Committees for Trade & Industry and Finance, Law and Home Affairs, and Communications and Information.

He was then appointed Chairperson of Defence and Foreign Affairs Government Parliamentary Committee (GPC) in the 14th Parliament of Singapore.

Personal life
Nair married banking executive Faye Ong in April 2015. They have a daughter.

References

External links
 Vikram Nair on Parliament of Singapore

Members of the Parliament of Singapore
People's Action Party politicians
21st-century Singaporean lawyers
Alumni of Trinity College, Cambridge
National University of Singapore alumni
Raffles Junior College alumni
1978 births
Living people